Hemmental was a municipality in the canton of Schaffhausen in Switzerland.  In 2009 Hemmental merged with Schaffhausen.

First Settlement 
It is generally accepted that Hemmental was settled between the 7th and 8th centuries by the Alemans.  Local tradition states that the village was named after a Germanic priest probably named Hemo. According to the records of Burkhard of Nellenburg, in 1090 Hemo gave Hemmental, together with Buesingen and Berslingen, to the Abbey of Allerheiligen in Schaffhausen. About 30 families may have lived at that time in Hemmental.

Leu, Schlatter, Hatt and Mettler families 
In the year 1483, the name "Schlatter" first appears in Hemmental, followed by those of "Mettler", "Hatt" and "Leu".   These families dominated in the area.  Today, there are also the four place names, Schlatter, Leuen, Hatten and Mettlerhof reflecting this influence. Three of these family names still prevail in Hemmental; the name Mettler no longer being found here. It is these four names which, in 1951, led to the resolution that a new village coat of arms be introduced - four golden stars on blue and red shield.  The blazon of the municipal coat of arms is Per saltire Gules and Azure in each a Mullet Or.

Geography
Of this area, 26.6% is used for agricultural purposes, while 70.3% is forested. The rest of the land, (3%) is settled. It is a farming village at the foot of the Randen range.

Demographics
In the 2007 federal election the most popular party was the SVP which received 53.9% of the vote.  The next two most popular parties were the SP (27.2%), and the FDP (18.8%).

The historical population is given in the following table:

References

External links 
 

Former municipalities of the canton of Schaffhausen
Former municipalities of Switzerland